Robert Morgan Carlock (born September 21, 1972) is an American screenwriter and producer. He has worked as a writer for several NBC television comedies, and as a showrunner for 30 Rock, which was created by his recurring collaborator, comedian Tina Fey. He co-created Unbreakable Kimmy Schmidt with Fey. He co-created the television show Mr. Mayor starring Ted Danson, again with Fey.

Early life
Carlock was born in Waltham, Massachusetts, the son of Martha and Roger Emery Carlock. Raised in Weston, Massachusetts, he graduated from Belmont Hill School in 1991 and cum laude from Harvard University in 1995, where he became president of the Fly Club, an all-male social club, and an editor for the Harvard Lampoon.

Career

Carlock began writing for the Dana Carvey Show in 1996. Following that, he was a member of the writing staff of Saturday Night Live from 1996 to 2001, contributing to 99 episodes of the show. One of his notable SNL sketches was NPR's Delicious Dish with Ana Gasteyer and Molly Shannon. In 2011, Ben and Jerry's released a new ice cream flavor based on the sketch written by Carlock and named it "Schweddy Balls".

Carlock left SNL in 2001 to write for Friends in Los Angeles, working on the show until 2004 when he joined the staff of Friends spinoff Joey for two years. Carlock then moved back to New York to work on an "Untitled Tina Fey Project" in 2006, which became 30 Rock, which he wrote for and produced. He then worked on Fey's next sitcom, Unbreakable Kimmy Schmidt, which debuted in 2015. He also wrote the screenplay for Fey's film Whiskey Tango Foxtrot (2016).

Carlock has won several awards for his work on 30 Rock, including Primetime Emmys, Writers Guild of America Awards, and Producers Guild of America Awards, as well as being named one of the top 50 power showrunners of 2011.

In 2021, Carlock co-created the series Mr. Mayor with Fey which premiered on NBC on January 7, 2021. The series has received generally positive reviews from critics. In April 2021, the series was renewed for a second season.

Personal life
On December 31, 2001, Carlock married Jennifer Nielsen Rogers, a Wellesley graduate and former CNNfn producer/reporter. Rogers now works as an anchor for Yahoo Finance. She was previously an anchor and reporter for Reuters TV.

Filmography

Awards and nominations
In addition to winning three Emmy Awards for Outstanding Comedy Series, Carlock has been nominated for the Emmys' individual writing award three times. He has won multiple Producers’ Guild and Writers’ Guild Awards as well as recognition from the American Film Institute. His work on 30 Rock also garnered Carlock a Peabody Award, a Television Critics Association Award, a GLAAD Award, a Gold Plaque from the Hugo Television Awards, a Golden Nymph from the Monaco Film and Television Festival, a Bravo A-List Award, some award that's shaped like a Calder stabile, a Comedy Central Comedy Award, and a Golden Globe.

The following awards are categorized under the year they were announced (and not necessarily the year covered by the award ceremony).

References

External links

American television writers
American male television writers
Television producers from Massachusetts
The Harvard Lampoon alumni
Living people
1972 births 
People from Waltham, Massachusetts
Writers Guild of America Award winners
Screenwriters from Massachusetts